Ink is a liquid containing pigments or dyes used for drawing, writing or printing.

Ink may also refer to:

Places 
 Ink, Arkansas, United States
 Ink, Missouri, United States

Arts, entertainment, and media

Fictional characters
 Ink (comics), a character in the Marvel universe
 Ink, a character in the study guide series Moetan
 Ink, the only female character and a drummer in Happy Monster Band

Literature
 Ink (novel), the second novel by Hal Duncan
 Ink (play), a play about the history of Rupert Murdoch's newspaper The Sun -- see Muriel McKay

Music

Groups and labels
 Ink, a music group formed by members of Jerk
 Ice Nine Kills, or "INK", an American metalcore band

Albums
 Ink (Frogcircus album), 2010
 Ink (The Fixx album), 1991

Songs
 "Ink" (song), a Coldplay song
"Ink", a song by the American post-hardcore band Finch from the album Say Hello to Sunshine

Television
 Ink (TV series), an American sitcom starring real-life husband and wife Ted Danson and Mary Steenburgen as newspaper journalists
 I.N.K. Invisible Network of Kids, an animated children's show
 "Ink" (Heroes), a 2009 episode of the TV series Heroes

Other arts, entertainment, and media
 Ink (film), a 2009 fantasy movie
 Ink newspaper, a newspaper published in Fort Wayne, Indiana

Brands and enterprises
 Ink (company), a travel media company
 Ink, a line of Chase Bank credit cards, such as Ink Business Plus and Ink Business Cash

Slang
 Article (publishing), in journalism, generating "ink" is slang for writing and publishing articles
 Tattoo, "ink" is slang for one or more tattoos

Other uses 
 INK (operating system), a Linux-derivative operating system
 Cephalopod ink, a secretion of cephalopods such as octopus, squid and cuttlefish

See also 
 Inkwell (software), handwriting and gesture recognition software by Apple
 Inky (disambiguation)
 Inked (disambiguation)
 Inque, a character from the animated show Batman Beyond